Shinkaia crosnieri is a species of squat lobster in a monotypic genus in the family Munidopsidae. S. crosnieri lives in deep-sea hydrothermal vent ecosystems, living off of the chemosynthetic activity of certain bacteria living on its setae.

References

Squat lobsters
Monotypic arthropod genera